Subclemensia is a genus of moths of the family Incurvariidae.

Selected species
Subclemensia taigae Kozlov, 1987

References
Определитель насекомых Дальнего Востока России. Т. V. Ручейники и чешуекрылые Ч.1. / под общ.ред. П. А. Лера. — Владивосток: «Дальнаука», 1997. — С. 291. — 540 с. — 500 экз. — 

Incurvariidae
Adeloidea genera